Chris Merritt is an American football coach and former player. He was named to the position as the head football coach at Bryant University in December 2018. He came to Bryant after serving 18 years as head coach at Christopher Columbus High School in Miami, Florida, posting a record of 172–45 in 18 season there. He also served five years at Thiel College as the defensive backs coach and special teams coordinator and two years at Eastern Illinois University as an assistant coach.

Merritt played college football at Indiana University Bloomington and professionally in Sweden Superserienin 1994 and 1995 seasons. He then played and was a coach in the German Football League with the Hamburg Blue Devils.

Head coaching record

College

References

External links
 Bryant profile

Year of birth missing (living people)
Living people
American football safeties
Bryant Bulldogs football coaches
Eastern Illinois Panthers football coaches
Indiana Hoosiers football players
Thiel Tomcats football coaches
High school football coaches in Florida
American expatriate players of American football
American expatriate sportspeople in Sweden
American expatriate sportspeople in Germany